A Favor to a Friend is a lost 1919 silent film comedy produced and distributed by Metro Pictures and directed by John Ince. The film starred Emmy Wehlen.

Cast

References

External links
 
 
 surviving glass slide

1919 films
American silent feature films
Lost American films
Films directed by John Ince
1919 comedy films
Silent American comedy films
American black-and-white films
1919 lost films
Lost comedy films
1910s American films